Bernice Metesh (born August 9, 1929) was an outfielder and pitcher who played in the All-American Girls Professional Baseball League. Listed at 5' 6, 132 lb., Metesh batted and threw right handed. She was dubbed 'Bernie' by her teammates.

Born in Joliet, Illinois, Metesh joined the All-American League in its 1948 season. She was assigned to the Rockford Peaches and was traded to the South Bend Blue Sox during the midseason. In a three-game career, Metesh went hitless in two at-bats and did not have a pitching record. Afterwards, she returned to Joliet and pitched for an all-male fastpitch softball team.

In 1988 was inaugurated a permanent display at the Baseball Hall of Fame and Museum at Cooperstown, New York, that honors those who were part of the All-American Girls Professional Baseball League. Bernie Metesh along with the rest of the girls and the league staff, is included at the display/exhibit.

Sources

1929 births
Possibly living people
All-American Girls Professional Baseball League players
Baseball players from Illinois
Sportspeople from Joliet, Illinois